The 1876 Mens Lawn Tennis Season was the first edition of the pre-open era men's tennis seasons consisting of just 2 tournaments. It began on 22 July in Dublin, Ireland and ended on 15 September in Limerick, Ireland.

Summary of season
Before the birth of Open Era, most tournaments were reserved for amateur athletes. In 1874 the British Major Walter Clopton Wingfield he patent the House of London Crafts the invention of a new game, which consists of a shaped field hourglass, divided in the middle by a net suspended. The game was packaged in a box containing some balls, four paddles, the network and the signs to mark the field. The game was based on the rules of the old real tennis and, at the suggestion of Arthur Balfour, was called lawn-tennis. The official date of birth of the court would be February 23, 1874.

This year the world's first two official tennis tournaments for men are held, one the All Ireland Lawn Tennis Championships organised by the All Ireland Lawn Tennis Club and held at the Champion Ground, Lansdowne, Dublin. The other the South of Ireland Championships in Limerick, County Limerick. The following year the tournament would staged the first Open championships in Ireland took place in August 1877, the same year as the first All-England championships of Wimbledon. The event was not held in Dublin but at the Limerick Lawn Tennis Club, putting Limerick in a premier position on the tennis map predating Fitzwilliam Lawn Tennis Club by two years.

Calendar 
Notes 1: Challenge Round: the final round of a tournament, in which the winner of a single-elimination phase faces the previous year's champion, who plays only that one match. The challenge round was used in the early history of tennis (from 1877 through 1921), in some tournaments not all.* Indicates challenger
Key

January to June
No events

July

August
No events

September

November to December 
No events

Tournament winners

  W. Peebles–Dublin–(1)
   William Henry Darby–Limerick–(1)

Tournaments
 All Ireland Lawn Tennis Championships
 South of Ireland Championships

References

Pre Open era tennis seasons
1876 in tennis